John Nettleton may refer to:

John Nettleton (actor), British actor
John Dering Nettleton, South Africa recipient of the Victoria Cross